Orrdalsklint, at 129.1 metres (423.6 ft) above sea level, is the highest point on the autonomous region of Åland in Finland. The hill is located in the municipality of Saltvik, some 7 kilometers Northeast of the town center.

An observation tower and a cabin for hikers are located on the top. They were built during World War II for air observation.

References

See also 
List of islands by highest point

Hills of Finland
Landforms of Åland